The objectives of the Highways Department are to maintain and improve the existing roads, such as State Highways, Major District Roads and Other District Roads in the District under the control of the State Government, and to provide better road connectivity with other places / districts.

Highways Department (Construction & Maintenance) Tiruvallur division aims to develop and maintain the Highway network in the district and also ensures road safety and to cope with the future economic development of the state.

In Tiruvallur Highways (C & M) Division, the total length of 1733 Kilometre of Government roads are maintained.

Sub-Division 
Tiruvallur Highways Division has 6 Sub–Division.

 Tiruvallur Sub-Division

 Gummidipoondi Sub-Division

 Ponneri Sub-Division

 Ambattur Sub-Division

 Tiruttani Sub-Division

 Pallipet Sub-Division

Classification 

The Classification of road are as follows

State Highways (SH) the total length of Kilometre is 548.0

Major District Roads (MDR) the total length of Kilometre is 316.6

Other District Roads (ODR) the total length of Kilometre is 868.3

State Highways

Major District Roads

Other District Roads

See also 
 Highways of Tamil Nadu 
 Road Network in Tamil Nadu
 National Highways
 List of National Highways in India
 List of National Highways in India (by Highway Number)
 National Highways Authority of India

References 

Roads in Tamil Nadu
Tamil Nadu highways
Tamil Nadu-related lists